U.S. Route 10, later U.S. Highway 10 (US 10) was a United States Numbered Highway in the state of Montana from 1926 to 1986. It was mostly replaced with Interstate 90 (I-90) and I-94; sections in major city centers were replaced by business routes and state highways. It was the longest segment of US 10 in one state.

Route description

US 10 in Montana started on the Idaho border in the Lookout Pass. As it traveled through the mountains, it traveled through several small towns, including St. Regis, where it intersected Montana Highway 461. From here it continued east towards Missoula. In the Missoula area, US 10 would intersect US 10A (later MT 200), US 93, US 12 and MT 20 (later MT 200). The route within Missoula still exists and is signed as I-90 Business. US 10 and US 12 ran concurrently east of Missoula until US 12 split off in Garrison. An alternate route split from US 10 in Drummond and rejoined US 10 east of Anaconda. After leaving Anaconda, US 10 would continue to travel east towards Butte. Shortly before entering Butte, US 10 would intersect US 91 (later I-15) and US 91 would travel concurrently with US 10 into downtown Butte.

History
Before the establishment of the United States Numbered Highway System, a transcontinental road called the Yellowstone Trail ran through Montana. This trail overlapped much of what would become US 10 and later I-90. US 10 completely replaced the Yellowstone Trail in Montana by 1930.

US 10 was one of the first US Highways established in 1926. Over time, it was slowly upgraded to freeway standards after the Interstate Highway System was introduced in 1956. Eventually, the majority of US 10 (except a section later designated Montana Highway 2) ran concurrently with the Interstates 90 and 94. In 1986, the US 10 designation was completely decommissioned in Montana. Many sections of the former route that were not upgraded to freeway standards are now either signed as Interstate 90 Business, Interstate 94 Business, as a Montana Secondary Highway or simply "Old U.S. Highway 10" or some derivative of it.

US 10N

Until 1959, US 10 split into two sections. US 10N was replaced by MT 287 and US 12. US 10S became the mainline US 10 route after US 10N was decommissioned in 1959.

Decommissioning
In 1977, US 10 in Idaho was decommissioned from the intersection with US 95 Alt east of Coeur d’Alene to intersection with US 93/MT 200 in Wye, Montana. In 1986, Montana and North Dakota truncated US 10 to its current terminus in West Fargo, North Dakota, and also decommissioned US 10A. After US 10 was decommissioned, Montana created State Highway 2 to replace a portion of former US 10 from Butte to Three Forks. Montana Highway 1 was created to replace former US 10A from Drummond to Anaconda.

Major intersections

This list follows the final non-freeway alignment in 1960.

Related routes
U.S. Route 310
U.S. Route 10 Alternate (Washington–Montana)
Montana Highway 1

References

10
10
Montana